Richard Keith Uecker (born June 29, 1960) is a former guard in the National Football League who played eight seasons for the Green Bay Packers and two for the Denver Broncos. Uecker currently is the offensive line coach and assistant head coach at Adrian College (Michigan), an NCAA Division III school.

Uecker was an All-American at Auburn in 1981 and was a four-year starter for the Tigers, earning All-SEC honors. Serving as 1981 team captain, he was twice the winner of the Ken Rice Award as the team's outstanding offensive lineman.

In the NFL, Uecker started 1 of 85 games. With the Packers, he was a four-year starter and played all five line positions. He was the 1987 recipient of the prestigious Ed Block Courage Award.

In 1987, Uecker was the only Green Bay Packers player to cross the NFL player strike picket lines and played along with replacement players that season.

1n 1989, While with the Green Bay Packers, Uecker was among the first class of NFL players suspended for steroid use.

Uecker has worked with the Ohio State University as offensive quality control coach (2009–2010) and most recently as offensive line coach with the UFL's Omaha Nighthawks (2010). He served as the offensive line coach at Wayne State University (2004–2005) and the University of Akron (1999–2003) before spending several years in the automotive industry. He also did an internship with the Denver Broncos during their 2008 training camp. He earned his accounting degree from Auburn in 1988.

A native of Hollywood, Florida, Uecker has four children: Victoria, Jack, Clayton and Jane.

References

1960 births
Living people
American football offensive linemen
Adrian Bulldogs football coaches
Akron Zips football coaches
Auburn Tigers football players
Denver Broncos players
Green Bay Packers players
Ohio State Buckeyes football coaches
Omaha Nighthawks coaches
Wayne State Warriors football coaches
People from Hollywood, Florida
Uecker, Keith
National Football League replacement players
Ed Block Courage Award recipients